St. Stanislaus Kostka Church is a mission church designated for Polish immigrants in Adams, Massachusetts, United States.

Founded in December 1902, it is one of the Polish-American Roman Catholic parishes in New England in the Diocese of Springfield in Massachusetts. On January 1, 2009, was temporarily closed by decision of the Bishop Timothy A. McDonnell of the Diocese of Springfield in Massachusetts.  After 1,150 days of parishioners sitting in vigil, it was announced on February 18, 2012, that St. Stan's would reopen on Palm Sunday (April 1) 2012. The church offers Sunday Mass, all Holy Days of Obligation, weddings, funerals, and baptisms.  St. Stan's now serves as a mission church of St. John Paul II Parish in Adams.

School 

 St. Stanislaus Kostka School, Adams, MA (Grades: PK - 8)

References

Bibliography 

 

 

 The Official Catholic Directory in USA

External links 
 Diocese of Springfield in Massachusetts

See also 
 Keeping Faith St. Stanislaus Kostka Fights Closing
 Diocese Drops the Hammer in Adams, N. Adams

Roman Catholic parishes of Diocese of Springfield in Massachusetts
Polish-American Roman Catholic parishes in Massachusetts
Polish Cathedral style architecture
Churches in Berkshire County, Massachusetts
1902 establishments in Massachusetts
Roman Catholic churches completed in 1902
20th-century Roman Catholic church buildings in the United States